The 2018 LTi Printing 250 was the 13th stock car race of the 2018 NASCAR Xfinity Series season, and the 27th iteration of the event. The race was held on Saturday, June 9, 2018, in Brooklyn, Michigan at Michigan International Speedway, a two-mile (3.2 km) permanent moderate-banked D-shaped speedway. The race was shortened from 125 laps to 91 due to rain stopping the race. At race's end, Austin Dillon of Richard Childress Racing would win a rain-shortened race after battling with fellow teammate Daniel Hemric in a one-lap shootout during a restart. The win was Dillon's ninth and so far final career win in the NASCAR Xfinity Series and his first and only of the season. To fill out the podium, Cole Custer of Stewart-Haas Racing with Biagi-DenBeste would finish third.

Background 

The race was held at Michigan International Speedway, a two-mile (3.2 km) moderate-banked D-shaped speedway located in Brooklyn, Michigan. The track is used primarily for NASCAR events. It is known as a "sister track" to Texas World Speedway as MIS's oval design was a direct basis of TWS, with moderate modifications to the banking in the corners, and was used as the basis of Auto Club Speedway. The track is owned by International Speedway Corporation. Michigan International Speedway is recognized as one of motorsports' premier facilities because of its wide racing surface and high banking (by open-wheel standards; the 18-degree banking is modest by stock car standards).

Entry list 

*Withdrew.

Practice

First practice 
The first 50-minute practice session would occur on Friday, June 8, at 1:05 PM EST.

Second and final practice 
The last 50-minute practice session, sometimes referred to as Happy Hour, would occur on Friday, June 8, at 3:05 PM EST.

Starting lineup 
Qualifying was scheduled to occur on Saturday, June 9, at 10:05 AM EST. Since Michigan International Speedway is at least , the qualifying system was a single car, single lap, two round system where in the first round, everyone would set a time to determine positions 13-40. Then, the fastest 12 qualifiers would move on to the second round to determine positions 1-12.

However, rain would cancel qualifying, and the starting lineup was therefore made by the rulebook, with the top 30 set by owner's points and positions 31-40 set by champion's provisionals and owner attempts. As a result, Kyle Busch of Joe Gibbs Racing would win the pole.

No drivers would fail to qualify.

Full starting lineup

Race results 
Stage 1 Laps: 30

Stage 2 Laps: 30

Stage 3 Laps: 31

References 

2018 NASCAR Xfinity Series
NASCAR races at Michigan International Speedway
June 2018 sports events in the United States
2018 in sports in Michigan